Viktor Aleksandrovich Zinger (29 October 1941 – 24 September 2013) was a Russian ice hockey goaltender. As a member of the Soviet national team he won gold medals at the Winter Olympics in 1968 and at the world championships in 1965–1969; on all those occasions he was a backup for Viktor Konovalenko, except for 1969. Zinger also toured Canada as a member of a Moscow Selects team that played the Canadian National team and various club teams. Zinger was inducted into the Russian and Soviet Hockey Hall of Fame in 1967.

Zinger started his club career in 1958, with HC CSKA Moscow coached by Anatoli Tarasov. At the time CSKA already had two strong goaltenders, Nikolai Puchkov and Yuri Ovchukov. Hence Zinger had no opportunity to play in the Soviet League until 1961, when he was transferred to SKA Kuibyshev. In 1964 he moved to HC Spartak Moscow and played for them until retiring in 1977. With Spartak he won the Soviet title in 1967, 1969 and 1976 and placed second in the IIHF European Champions Cup in 1970 and 1977. After retiring from competitions, Zinger had a long career with Spartak, first as goaltender coach of the main team and then as head coach of the junior team.

References

External links
 Russian and Soviet Hockey Hall of Fame bio

1941 births
2013 deaths
HC Spartak Moscow players
Honoured Masters of Sport of the USSR
Ice hockey players at the 1968 Winter Olympics
Olympic gold medalists for the Soviet Union
Olympic ice hockey players of the Soviet Union
Olympic medalists in ice hockey
Soviet ice hockey goaltenders
Ice hockey people from Moscow
Soviet Jews
Russian Jews